Miriam Smith may refer to:
 Miriam Smith (swimmer)
 Miriam Smith (filmmaker)